Einar Kringlen (born 6 June 1931) is a Norwegian physician and psychiatrist. He was born in Høyanger; the son of teachers Andreas Kringlen and Enbjørg Lotsberg. Among his early research works are Schizophrenia in male monozygotic twins from 1964, and his thesis Heredity and environment in the functional psychoses from 1967. He was professor at the University of Bergen from 1970 to 1971, and at the University of Oslo from 1977 to 2001. He was decorated Knight, First Class of the Order of St. Olav in 2002.

References

1931 births
Living people
People from Høyanger
Norwegian psychiatrists
Norwegian psychology writers
Academic staff of the University of Bergen
Academic staff of the University of Oslo